Arun Kumar Guththur is an Indian politician who is the current Member of the Karnataka Legislative Assembly from Ranebennur Vidhan Sabha constituency in the by-election in 2019 as a Bharatiya Janata Party candidate.

References

1978 births
Living people
Karnataka MLAs 2018–2023
Bharatiya Janata Party politicians from Karnataka
People from Haveri district